Azadirachta is a genus of two species of trees in the family Meliaceae. Numerous species have been proposed for the genus but only two are currently recognized, Azadirachta excelsa and the economically important tree Azadirachta indica, the Neem tree, from which neem oil is extracted. Both species are native to the Indomalaysian region, and A. indica is also widely cultivated and naturalized outside its native range.

In traditional medicine in India, the resin from the trees have been attributed with medical benefits. A component in the resin is an effective insecticide; see azadirachtin. Another component is an effective anti-fungal; see Azadirachta indica.

These species should not be confused with Melia azedarach, which is a tree in a different genus of the mahogany family.

References

 Mabberley, D. J. et al. 1995. Azadirachta, pp. 337–343. In: Flora Malesiana ser. 1 Spermatophyta 12(1): 1–407.
  

 
Meliaceae genera